John McNee is a Canadian career diplomat.  McNee was Canada's Ambassador to the United Nations from 2006 to July 2011.

McNee earned a Bachelor of Arts in History from York University in Canada in 1973 and a Master of Arts in History from Cambridge University in 1975.

He joined the Department of External Affairs in 1978 and has served in Spain, the United Kingdom and Israel.

In the 1980s, he was on then Prime Minister Pierre Trudeau's Task Force on International Peace and Security and also served in the Privy Council Office.

He was Canadian Ambassador to Syria from 1993 to 1997 and concurrently served as envoy to Lebanon until 1995.

Returning to Ottawa he served in the Policy Development Secretariat of the Department of Foreign Affairs and as Director General, Middle East, North Africa and Gulf States Bureau.

From 2004 until 2006 McNee was Canada's Ambassador to Belgium and Luxembourg. His appointment to the United Nations was announced in February 2006 and he succeeded Allan Rock in the position at the beginning of July. McNee was succeeded by Guillermo E. Rishchynski.

In June 2011, McNee was appointed the first Secretary-General of the Global Centre for Pluralism. Based in Ottawa, the Centre for Pluralism is an initiative of His Highness the Aga Khan in partnership with the Government of Canada. As Secretary-General, McNee is responsible for building the Centre’s institutional and intellectual capacities as a global knowledge hub working with its international Board of Directors.

References

1951 births
Alumni of the University of Cambridge
Ambassadors of Canada to Belgium
Ambassadors of Canada to Lebanon
Ambassadors of Canada to Luxembourg
Ambassadors of Canada to Syria
Living people
People from London, Ontario
Permanent Representatives of Canada to the United Nations
York University alumni